The Oltjenbruns Farm in Phillips County, Colorado near Amherst, Colorado, also known as Welper Farm, is a  farm which was listed on the National Register of Historic Places in 2016.

The district includes nine contributing buildings, three contributing structures, one contributing site, and one contributing object, as well as two non-contributing buildings. It was built by Robert Buchholz and is in a simplified Dutch Colonial Revival style. August Welper, a farmer from Nebraska, raised chickens, cows, and horses and grew alfalfa and wheat. From the dairy, he sold milk, cream, and butter.

References

Historic districts on the National Register of Historic Places in Colorado
Phillips County, Colorado
Farms in Colorado